Admiral Bruce may refer to:

Henry Bruce (Royal Navy officer, born 1792) (1792–1863), British Royal Navy admiral
Henry Bruce (Royal Navy officer) (1862–1948), British Royal Navy admiral
James Andrew Thomas Bruce (1846–1921), British Royal Navy admiral